Cliff is an English surname. Notable people with the surname include: 

Alfred Cliff (1878–1966), English amateur cricketer
Clarice Cliff (1899–1972), British ceramic artist
Dave Cliff (born 1944), British jazz musician
Ian Cliff (born 1952), British diplomat 
Jimmy Cliff, (born 1948), Jamaican reggae musician
John Cliff (1883–1977), British transport executive
Leslie Cliff (swimmer) (born 1955), Canadian swimmer
Michelle Cliff (born 1946), Jamaican-American author
Nigel Cliff (born 1969), English historian, biographer and critic
Norman Cliff (born 1930), American psychology professor
Tony Cliff (1917–2000), Jewish Trotskyist activist
 Bernard Shir-Cliff (1924-2017), American editor

See also
Cliff (disambiguation)
Cliff (given name)

English-language surnames
English toponymic surnames